Carsten Bach Riis (born 9 December 1975 in Holstebro) is a Danish politician, who was a member of the Folketing for the Liberal Alliance from 2015 to 2019.

Political career
Bach was elected into parliament at the 2015 Danish general election, where he received 1,931 votes. This was enough for one of the Liberal Alliance's levelling seats. In the 2019 election he received 734 votes and did not get reelected.

References

External links 
 Biography on the website of the Danish Parliament (Folketinget)

Living people
1975 births
People from Holstebro
Liberal Alliance (Denmark) politicians
Members of the Folketing 2015–2019
Members of the Folketing 2022–2026